Idon is a town in central Nigeria.

Namesakes 

There are a number of other places with similar names.

Transport 

Idon is served by a nearby station on a cross-country branch line of the nation railway network.

See also 

 Railway stations in Nigeria

References 

Towns in Nigeria